José Salazar Ilarregui (September 25 1823 – May 9 1892) was a Mexican politician and statesman. Ilarregui was the Governor of Yucatan during the Second Mexican Empire of Maximilian of Habsburg. He worked in the Mexican Commission of Borders between Mexico-U.S in 1848, and Mexico-Guatemala in 1878-1885.

Treaty of Limits between Mexico and the United States 
José Salazar was a surveyor of the Mexican Commission of Borders Matamoros Section of the peace treaty that was signed in the sacristy of the Basilica of Guadalupe in Mexico City on February 2, 1848, and was called Treaty of Peace, Friendship, Limits and Settlement between the United States of America and the Mexican Republic. This document specified the border between the two countries, which included the loss to Mexico of more than half of its territory, which would be added to the United States.

The Mexican Commission of Borders was integrated by:

First stage

Second stage

References 

1823 births
1892 deaths
Yucatán